Winter's Majesty is the seventeenth album by Nox Arcana, concluding their winter-themed trilogy, which also includes Winter's Knight (2005) and Winter's Eve (2009).

The music on this album features original and traditional holiday songs, including an instrumental version of "We Three Kings" and a new rendition of "Scarborough Fair" which is presented as a ghost-story with original lyrics and musical arrangements by Joseph Vargo.

Track listing
All music composed and performed by Joseph Vargo
 "Aquilon’s Wish" – 3:52
 "Tranquility" – 2:49
 "White Woodlands" – 3:13
 "Secret Sanctuary" – 3:03
 "Summon the Wind" – 1:43
 "Snow in the Shire" – 3:06
 "Crystal Kingdom" – 3:45
 "Solstice Spirits" – 3:07
 "Shelter from the Cold" – 3:51
 "Angels in the Snow" – 2:47
 "Scarborough Fair" – 5:47
 "Ivory Steeds" – 2:33
 "Winter Haven" – 3:00
 "Forest Lullaby" – 2:34
 "Days of Olde" – 2:54
 "Saturnalia" – 3:28
 "The Coming of the King" – 3:53
 "Winter’s Majesty" – 3:49
 "We Three Kings" – 3:17
 "Polaris" – 2:26
 "Final Peace" – 3:48
 The song "Final Peace" ends at 2:15. An untitled hidden track begins at 2:40.

References

External links 
 
[ Winter's Majesty] at Allmusic

Nox Arcana albums
2012 albums
2012 Christmas albums
Christmas albums by American artists